Ronald Clements may refer to:

R. E. Clements, British biblical scholar
Ron Clements, American animation director